Bernd Krauß (born 15 June 1953) is a German rower, who competed for the SC Dynamo Potsdam / Sportvereinigung (SV) Dynamo. He won the medals at the international rowing competitions. Krauß went to the 1978 World Rowing Championships on Lake Karapiro in New Zealand as a reserve but did not compete.

References 

East German male rowers
Living people
Olympic medalists in rowing
Olympic gold medalists for East Germany
World Rowing Championships medalists for East Germany
1953 births
Olympic rowers of East Germany
Rowers at the 1980 Summer Olympics
Medalists at the 1980 Summer Olympics
People from Plauen
Sportspeople from Saxony